Pempeliella is a genus of moths of the family Pyralidae described by Aristide Caradja in 1916.

Species
Pempeliella alibotuschella (Drenowski, 1932)
Pempeliella ardosiella (Ragonot, 1887)
Pempeliella aurorella (Christoph, 1867)
Pempeliella bayassensis Leraut, 2001
Pempeliella enderleini (Rebel, 1934)
Pempeliella lecerfella (D. Lucas, 1933
Pempeliella macedoniella Ragonot, 1887
Pempeliella malacella Staudinger, 1870
Pempeliella matilella Leraut, 2001
Pempeliella ornatella (Denis & Schiffermüller, 1775)
Pempeliella sororculella Ragonot, 1887
Pempeliella sororiella (Zeller, 1839)

References

Phycitini
Pyralidae genera
Taxa named by Aristide Caradja